Trophon melvillsmithi is a species of sea snail, a marine gastropod mollusk in the family Muricidae, the murex snails or rock snails.

Description
The shell can grow to be 7 mm in length.

Distribution
It can be found off of Namibia.

References

Gastropods described in 1989
Trophon